Hastings was a parliamentary constituency in  Sussex. It returned two Members of Parliament to the House of Commons of the Parliament of the United Kingdom until the 1885 general election, when its representation was reduced to one member. It was abolished for the 1983 general election, when it was partially replaced by the new Hastings and Rye constituency.

Boundaries 
1918–1950: The County Borough of Hastings.

1950–1955: The County Borough of Hastings, the Municipal Borough of Rye, and part of the Rural District of Battle.

1955–1983:

Members of Parliament

MPs 1366–1640

MPs 1640–1885

MPs 1885–1983

Elections

Elections in the 1830s

The votes for Warre, Cave and Taddy were rejected by the mayor.

Elections in the 1840s

Planta resigned by accepting the office of Steward of the Chiltern Hundreds, causing a by-election.

Elections in the 1850s

 
 

Brisco resigned by accepting the office of Steward of the Chiltern Hundreds, causing a by-election.

Elections in the 1860s
Powlett succeeded to the peerage, becoming Duke of Cleveland, and causing a by-election.

 
 

 
 
 

North's death caused a by-election.

Elections in the 1870s

Elections in the 1880s

 

Brassey was appointed a Civil Lord of the Admiralty, requiring a by-election.

Murray resigned, causing a by-election.

Elections in the 1890s

Elections in the 1900s

Elections in the 1910s

General Election 1914/15

Another General Election was required to take place before the end of 1915. The political parties had been making preparations for an election to take place and by the July 1914, the following candidates had been selected; 
Unionist: Arthur Du Cros
Liberal: Cecil Patrick Black

Elections in the 1920s

Elections in the 1930s 

General Election 1939/40

Another General Election was required to take place before the end of 1940. The political parties had been making preparations for an election to take place and by the Autumn of 1939, the following candidates had been selected; 
Conservative: Maurice Hely-Hutchinson
Labour: William Wate Wood

Elections in the 1940s

Elections in the 1950s

Elections in the 1960s

Elections in the 1970s

References 

 Robert Beatson, A Chronological Register of Both Houses of Parliament (London: Longman, Hurst, Res & Orme, 1807) 
 D Brunton & D H Pennington, Members of the Long Parliament (London: George Allen & Unwin, 1954)
 Cobbett's Parliamentary history of England, from the Norman Conquest in 1066 to the year 1803 (London: Thomas Hansard, 1808) 
 F W S Craig, British Parliamentary Election Results 1832–1885 (2nd edition, Aldershot: Parliamentary Research Services, 1989)
 J E Neale, The Elizabethan House of Commons (London: Jonathan Cape, 1949)
 

Parliamentary constituencies in South East England (historic)
Constituencies of the Parliament of the United Kingdom established in 1366
Constituencies of the Parliament of the United Kingdom disestablished in 1983
Politics of East Sussex
Politics of Hastings
Cinque ports parliament constituencies